The list provides links to all lists of meet records for athletics competitions. These are the best performances set during the course of a specific competition. Multi-sport events typically refer to these as games records while single-sport championships refer to them as championship records. For non-championship competitions, the term meet or meeting record is usually used.

Global championships
 Olympics
 IAAF World Championships
 IAAF World Indoor Championships
 IAAF World Junior Championships in Athletics
 IAAF World Relays
 Universiade

International championships records

 ALBA Games
 African Championships in Athletics
 African Junior Athletics Championships
 Asian Athletics Championships
 Asian Indoor Athletics Championships
 Asian Junior Athletics Championships
 Bolivarian Games
 CARIFTA Games
 Central American Championships
 Central American Games
 Central American Junior and Youth Championships
 Central American and Caribbean Championships
 Central American and Caribbean Games
 Commonwealth Games
 European Athletics Championships
 European Athletics Indoor Championships
 European Athletics Junior Championships
 European Games
 European Youth Olympic Festival
 Ibero-American Championships in Athletics
 Micronesian Games
 NACAC Under-23 Championships
 Oceania Area Championships in Athletics
 Pacific Games
 Pan American Games
 Pan American Junior Athletics Championships
 Pan American Race Walking Cup
 South American Championships in Athletics
 South American Games
 South American Junior Championships in Athletics
 South American Youth Championships
 South Asian Games
 Southeast Asian Games

National championships

 Czech Athletics Championships
 German Athletics Championships Indoor records
 German Athletics Championships Outdoor records
 Japan Championships in Athletics
 Lithuanian Athletics Championships
 USA Indoor Track and Field Championships
 USA Outdoor Track and Field Championships

Notable annual meetings

 Adidas Grand Prix
 Adidas Track Classic
 Arcadia Invitational
 Athens Grand Prix Tsiklitiria
 Athletics Bridge
 Athletissima
 Bislett Games
 British Grand Prix
 CCCAA Championships
 Cezmi Or Memorial
 Colorful Daegu Championships Meeting
 DN Galan
 Drake Relays
 European Athletics Festival Bydgoszcz
 Fanny Blankers-Koen Games
 Golden Gala
 Golden Grand Prix
 Golden Spike Ostrava
 Grande Premio Brasil Caixa de Atletismo
 Hanžeković Memorial
 Herculis
 IAAF World Challenge Beijing
 Internationales Stadionfest (ISTAF Berlin)
 Jamaica International Invitational
 Janusz Kusociński Memorial
 Josef Odložil Memorial
 Kansas Relays
 London Grand Prix
 Meeting Areva
 Meeting de Atletismo Madrid
 Meeting Grand Prix IAAF de Dakar
 Melbourne Track Classic
 Memorial Primo Nebiolo
 Memorial Van Damme
 Mt. SAC Relays
 NCAA Men's Division I Outdoor Track and Field Championships
 NCAA Women's Division I Outdoor Track and Field Championships
 Osaka Grand Prix
 Palio Citta della Quercia
 Penn Relays
 Prefontaine Classic
 Ponce Grand Prix
 Qatar Athletic Super Grand Prix
 Rieti Meeting
 Shanghai Golden Grand Prix
 Sydney Track Classic
 Texas Relays
 Weltklasse Zürich

Indoor meets
 Aviva Indoor Grand Prix
 Boston Indoor Games
 Gugl Indoor Meeting
 Indoor Flanders Meeting
 Meeting Pas de Calais
 Millrose Games
 Russian Winter Meeting
 Sparkassen Cup
 Weltklasse in Karlsruhe
 XL Galan

See also
 

 Records